Bùi Bằng Đoàn (September 19, 1889 – April 13, 1955) was a Vietnamese politician. He led the League for the National Union of Vietnam (Hội Liên hiệp quốc dân Việt Nam/Liên Việt) 1946–1951 and was Chairman of the National Assembly of Vietnam.

Bùi Bằng Đoàn's son Bùi Tín, a senior Communist Party editor, defected to France in 1990.

References

External link

1889 births
1955 deaths
Chairmen of the Standing Committee of the National Assembly (Vietnam)